Kevin Kauber (born 23 March 1995) is an Estonian professional footballer who plays as a forward for Vaprus.

Club career
In 2018 he joined Welsh Premier League club The New Saints and left the club in August 2018 to play first-team football in Finland.

International career
Kauber started his international youth career in 2010. He was called up to the senior national team squad for a friendly against Andorra on 1 June 2016, but didn't make an appearance.

Honours

Club
Jelgava
Latvian Cup: 2015–16 1st place
Virsliga: 2016 2nd place

Levadia
Meistriliiga: 2016 2nd place

The New Saints
2017–18 Welsh League cup winner
2017–18 Cymru Premier League Champion

Paide
Meistriliiga: 2020 2nd place

References

External links

1995 births
Living people
Estonian footballers
Association football forwards
Veikkausliiga players
Slovenian PrvaLiga players
Turun Palloseura footballers
NK Krka players
Estonian expatriate footballers
Estonian expatriate sportspeople in Finland
Expatriate footballers in Finland
Estonian expatriate sportspeople in Slovenia
Expatriate footballers in Slovenia
Estonian expatriate sportspeople in Latvia
Expatriate footballers in Latvia
Expatriate footballers in Wales
Estonian expatriate sportspeople in Wales
FK Jelgava players
FCI Levadia Tallinn players
Meistriliiga players
Footballers from Tallinn
Åbo IFK players
The New Saints F.C. players
Cymru Premier players
Ykkönen players
FC Puuma Tallinn players
Ekenäs IF players
Paide Linnameeskond players
Pärnu JK Vaprus players